Macedonian Renaissance is a historiographical term used for the blossoming of Byzantine culture in the 9th–11th centuries, under the eponymous Macedonian dynasty (867–1056), following the upheavals and transformations of the 7th–8th centuries, also known as the "Byzantine Dark Ages". The period is also known as the era of Byzantine encyclopedism, because of the attempts to systematically organize and codify knowledge, exemplified by the works of the scholar-emperor Constantine VII Porphyrogennetos.

Historiographical term 
Because of problems with the term, scholars have employed alternative names to describe this period, including "renaissance" (with a small "r"), "renascence", Middle Byzantine Renaissance or First Byzantine Renaissance (the Palaeologan Renaissance from the 13th century on being the second).  Macedonian art refers to the art of this period.

Since the word Renaissance (rinascita) was created in the 15th and 16th centuries by Italian humanists to describe their own time, its use outside of that context is problematic; however, the period in question certainly did produce ideas and works of art that reflected a reassessment of classical ideals.

The term Macedonian Renaissance was first used by Kurt Weitzmann in his 1948 work, The Joshua Roll: A Work of the Macedonian Renaissance. It describes the architecture of Macedonia. At the same time, the manuscripts of "Paris Psalter" (cod. gr. 139, Paris, Bib. Nat. de France) were indicated as the best examples of Macedonian Renaissance by scholars.

Background 
During the 7th to 8th centuries, literary production saw a drastic decline despite the gradual introduction of paper instead of the more expensive parchment.  Books were scarce in this period and were only owned by the richest aristocrats.

From the 7th century onwards, Medieval Greek was the only language of administration, government and art in the Byzantine Empire, while the religion was Orthodox Christianity.

While the Western Roman Empire had collapsed at the outset of the Middle Ages, its Eastern half, the Eastern Roman Empire, was able to survive and flourish. This was due mainly to its strategic location for commerce but also to the way it was able to hold back its enemies. Basil I (867–886), the founder of the Macedonian Dynasty of Byzantine rulers, was born in Thrace to a peasant family said to be of Armenian descent. He was employed in the influential circles of Constantinople and was rapidly promoted by the emperor Michael III eventually becoming co-emperor. By means of political maneuvering he was able to secure his future as emperor and then began military and diplomatic campaigns to secure the empire. He was able to regain control over Crete and Cyprus at the same time he was able to hold back the First Bulgarian Empire's advances into his territory. His dynasty was thus able to maintain a period of peace under which economics, philosophy, art, and culture could thrive.

Two main developments helped drive the revival in culture and education in the empire: this was the greater involvement of the church in education (such as those in the Studite Monastery), while the other was the concentration of cultural life in the capital of Constantinople due to the movement of peoples from the countryside, which became a magnet for intellectuals.

Art and architecture 

Large-scale productions of religious art resumed only after the Second Iconoclasm in 843. The art of the Macedonian Renaissance maintained its roots from the Late Roman period, utilizing its decorative and artistic styles. This period produced a shift from the ban on the painting of religious figures to icons being painted to reflect the more classical and naturalistic influences of art on the culture. The new style of art may have inspired Italian artists such as Cimabue and Giotto at the dawn of the Italian Renaissance, in the Proto-Renaissance.

The second half of the 9th century saw a lavish programme of redecoration of churches, such as the creation of mosaics in the Hagia Sophia.

Literature and education 
By the Macedonian Renaissance, the period also saw a proliferation of literature, such as De Ceremoniis ("The Book of Ceremonies"), which focused on governance, diplomatic interactions with neighboring nations, and other customs of the time. Education had also become a priority once again and the University of Constantinople boasted scholars such as Michael Psellus, who wrote the Chronographia, a history of fourteen Byzantine rulers. Meanwhile, reforms in law sought to limit the power and growth of large land owners by the formation of trade guilds that allowed the state to control growth as described in the Book of the Eparch.

While in science and mathematics, Leo the Mathematician contributed vastly on the subject and he was also known for constructing an optical telegraph from Constantinople to the eastern regions of the empire. The building Magnaura in Constantinople had already become a school in 849 and was headed by Leo the Mathematician, whose works are now lost.

Encyclopaedism 
Paul Lemerle introduced the term "encyclopaedism" for this period, to reflect the systematic attempts at ordering and organizing knowledge in all spheres of cultural and administrative activity. This activity resulted in the compilation of manuals on court hierarchy and administration (Taktika), military affairs, taxation, agriculture (Geoponika), reference works such as the Suda encyclopaedia and the Bibliotheca, as well as new codifications of Roman law (the Basilika) and regulations in the Book of the Eparch. The spirit of the age was exemplified by Emperor Constantine VII Porphyrogennetos, who produced three encyclopaedic manuals: the De Administrando Imperio, De Thematibus, and De Ceremoniis. Other notable figures were the polymaths Leo the Mathematician, Patriarch Photios, and Arethas of Caesarea. However, as Alexander Kazhdan notes, their "emphasis was not on creativity, but on copying and collecting".

See also
 Macedonian art (Byzantine)
 Paris Psalter
 Leo Bible

Notes

Sources
 
 

Byzantine Greece
·
History of Macedonia (region)
Byzantine art
Byzantine architecture
Cultural history of Greece